Seabranch Preserve State Park is a Florida State Park, located approximately ten miles south of Stuart, off A1A.

Admission and Hours
There is no entrance charge. Florida state parks are open between 8 a.m. and sundown every day of the year (including holidays).

Climate 
The park marks end of subtropical climate (Cfa), being the most southern place near the east coast of Florida for tropical monsoon climate (Am), being important in phytogeography.

Gallery

References

External links
 Seabranch Preserve State Park at Florida State Parks
 Seabranch Preserve State Park at State Parks

State parks of Florida
Parks in Martin County, Florida